Joseph Kalias Ekemu (September 5, 1944) is a retired Attorney General of Uganda, lawmaker and statesman. He served as Justice Minister of Uganda from 1994 to 1996. Ekemu once was a member representing Kaberamaido District and as a committee in the NRC.

Jail sentences 
Ekemu along with David Kamwada, his personal assistant were jailed for two years at the Luzira prison over Shs113 million theft meant for Teso people who had lost their cattle during the insurgency of 1987 to 1990, the money was to compensate the Teso people. Other convictions was on a five count which amongst is the forgery of a Greenland Bank account opening form and the sentence was on a money belonging to a foreigner, Suresh Ghelan.

In 2002, he completed the two-year jail sentence. He was the first high-ranking Uganda government official to be convicted over fraud.

Legal practice resumption 
Ekemu had five months left in Law Council Disciplinary Committee (LCDC) before being jailed, he made an application to continue practicing law which was later rejected by the board and the head of the LCDC. Elijah Wante who had known Ekamu for a long time advised him to file a fresh application for reinstatement. After pleading to the LCDC committee board to allow him to continue practising law saying he had suffered a lot, the board noticed the five months left for him to end two mandatory years and later required him to file a new one after the terms ends.

In September 2004, he was restored as an advocate after serving a four-year ban; the ban was lifted by the committee board of the LCDC after indicating that he was repentant.

Bibliography 

 Joseph Ekemu. Encyclopedia, Joseph Ekemu, Unique Identifier: 4779375235. Notes: Occupation: lawyer Education: LLB with honors, Makerere University, 1971. Career: Minister justice and attorney general, Government of Uganda, Kampala, 1994 — Career: Deputy speaker parliament, 1994 Career: Member parliament, 1989–95 Career: Advocate, Ekemu & Co., Kampala, Uganda, 1972–89 Career: Advocate, Elemu & Kabu Co., Kampala, Uganda, 1972–89. Career: Advocate, Kulubya & Co. Advocates, Kampala, Uganda, 1972–89. Career: Advocate, Mboijana & Co. Advcates, Kampala, Uganda, 1972–89, Career: Pupil state attorney, Ministry of Justice, Kampala, Uganda, 1971–72.

References

External links 
 

 
 

1944 births
Living people
People from Kaberamaido District
Members of the Parliament of Uganda
National Resistance Movement politicians
People from Eastern Region, Uganda
Government ministers of Uganda
20th-century Ugandan lawyers
Attorneys General of Uganda
21st-century Ugandan lawyers